Troianul is a commune in Teleorman County, Muntenia, Romania. It has three villages: Dulceni, Troianul and  Vatra.

Natives 
Ion C. Pena (1911-1944), writer

References

Communes in Teleorman County
Localities in Muntenia